Granagh is a small village in County Limerick, Ireland located close to the N20 between Croom and Charleville. Granagh is a chapel village (a village that grew up around the church).

The camogie team of Granagh-Ballingarry GAA club have won three All-Ireland club titles.

Archaeology
The Blessed Well or St John's Well was a small holy well surrounded by thorn bushes inside north fence of road 400 yards west of Granagh Catholic church. Construction of the creamery and concrete yard appears to have removed all traces of the holy well and no archaeological features or finds were uncovered in the monitored area.

See also
 List of towns and villages in Ireland

References

External links
 Granagh Community Website
 Ballingarry - Granagh Parish
 Ballingarry - Granagh Parish Diocesan Heritage Project

Villages in Ireland
Towns and villages in County Limerick